Incest in the Bible refers to sexual relations between certain close kinship relationships which are prohibited by the Hebrew Bible. These prohibitions are found predominantly in 
Jewish views on incest are based on the biblical categories of forbidden relationships and have been subject to rabbinic interpretations in the Talmud. (See also Forbidden relationships in Judaism.) The Karaites reject the authority of Talmudic opinions and interpret the biblical prohibitions differently. The various Christian denominations set their own categories of prohibited incestuous relationships, which have changed from time to time. (See Affinity (Catholic canon law).) The laws of many countries regarding prohibited relationships do not necessarily follow the biblical prohibitions nor those of any particular church. (See Laws regarding incest.)

In ancient times, tribal nations preferred endogamous marriage marriage to one's relatives; the ideal marriage was usually that to a cousin, and it was often forbidden for an eldest daughter to even marry outside the family. Marriage to a half-sister, for example, is considered incest by most nations today, but was common behaviour for Egyptian pharaohs; similarly, the Book of Genesis portrays Sarah as marrying Abraham, her half-brother, without criticising the close genetic relationship between them, and the Book of Samuel treats the marriage of a royal prince to his half-sister as unusual, rather than wicked.

Prohibited relationships
 and  sets out lists of prohibited relationships, and two chapters later specifies punishments for such unions, but the second list of unions is much shorter than the first. Critical scholars regard the lists as having originally been independent documents, bound together at a later point. The Deuteronomic Code gives a yet more simple list of prohibited relationships a man's parent's daughter (including his sister), a man's father's wife (including his mother), and a man's mother-in-law. In the Hebrew Bible, sexual relationships between siblings are forbidden to Jews but permissible to Gentiles (non-Jews).

The relationships prohibited by Leviticus 18 are:

 One's mother
 One's father
 One's stepmother
 One's paternal or maternal sister
 One's paternal sister through one's father's wife
 One's daughter (inferred from )
 One's granddaughter
 A woman and her daughter
 A woman and her granddaughter
 One's aunt by blood
 One's father's brother (uncle)
 One's father's brother's wife (aunt)
 One's daughter-in-law
 One's brother's wife (sister-in-law), with the exception of Yibum
 One's wife's sister (sister-in-law) during one's wife's lifetime, even if since divorced

The lists of prohibited relationships can be summarised as follows (the relations highlighted in red are those that are prohibited):

One of the most notable features of each list is that sexual relations between a man and his own daughter is not explicitly prohibited. Although the first relation mentioned after the Levitical prohibition of sex with "near kin" names that of "thy father", it must be taken into account that the Hebrew original text only addresses male Jews with regard to their female relatives. The Talmud argues that the absence is because the prohibition was obvious, especially given the proscription against a relationship with a granddaughter, although some biblical scholars have instead proposed that it was originally in the list, but was then accidentally left out from the copy on which modern versions of the text ultimately depend, due to a mistake by the scribe. The second list in the Holiness code noticeably differs from the first by not including the closer relatives, and it might be assumed that obviousness is the explanation here as well. One might argue that the explicit prohibition against engaging in sexual activity with a woman as well as with her daughter, implicitly forbids sexual activity between a man and his daughter. However, the rationale might suggest otherwise (the original text is unclear here), since it mentions only that "they" (i.e., the woman and the daughter) are related. John Calvin did not consider the father-daughter-relation to be explicitly forbidden by the bible, but regarded it as immoral nevertheless.

Apart from the case of the daughter, the first incest list in Leviticus roughly produces the same rules as applied in early (pre-Islamic) Arabic culture; in Islam, these pre-Islamic rules were made statutory.

Ezekiel implies that, in his time, marriage between a man and his stepmother, or his daughter-in-law, or his sister, were frequent. This situation seems to be the target of the Deuteronomic version of the incest prohibition, which only addresses roughly the same three issues (though prohibiting the mother-in-law in place of the daughter-in-law). Early rabbinic commentators instead argue that the Deuteronomic list is so short because the other possible liaisons were obviously prohibited, and these three were the only liaisons difficult to detect, on account of the fact that, in their day, a man's stepmother, half-sister, and mother-in-law usually lived in the same house as the man (prior to any liaison).

Also, cousins are not included in the lists of prohibited relationships. However, the Bible prohibits relationships with any close blood relative.

Sex-specific rules
The biblical lists are not symmetrical the implied rules for women are not the same – they compare as follows:

Incestuous relationships mentioned in the Bible
The Bible mentions a number of sexual relationships between close kin, most of which relate to the pre-Sinai period, before the handing down of the Mosaic law:

 In , Ham saw his father Noah's nakedness. The Talmud suggests that Ham may have sodomized Noah (Babylonian Talmud Sanhedrin 70a). In more recent times, some scholars have suggested that Ham may have had intercourse with his father's wife.
 Abraham's brother Nahor married his niece Milcah, the daughter of his other brother Haran.
 Living in an isolated area after the destruction of Sodom and Gomorrah, Lot's two daughters conspired to inebriate and seduce their father due to the lack of available partners. Because of intoxication, Lot "perceived not" when his firstborn, and the following night his younger daughter, lay with him. The two children born were directly Lot's sons and indirectly his grandsons, being his daughters' sons. Likewise, their sons were also half-brothers (between them and with their mothers), having the same father, as well as cousins, having mothers that were sisters.
 In one of the tales of a wife confused for a sister, Abraham admitted that his wife Sarah is his half-sister—the daughter of his father but not his mother. However, in rabbinic literature, Sarah is considered Abraham's niece (the daughter of his brother, Haran).
 Marriage of cousins was common in the pre-Sinai period. Abraham's son Isaac married Rebekah, his first cousin once removed, the granddaughter of his father Abraham's brother Nahor with Milcah.
 Isaac and Rebekah's firstborn son Esau resorted to marrying his cousin Mahalath, daughter of his father's brother Ishmael because his parents didn't approve of him having relationships with Canaanites.
 Isaac and Rebekah's second son Jacob married his cousins Leah and Rachel, who were both sisters and daughters of his mother's brother Laban.
 Jacob's firstborn son Reuben had sex with his father's concubine Bilhah.
 Judah, Jacob's fourth son, mistook his daughter-in-law Tamar for a prostitute while she was veiled, and had sex with her.
 Amram married his paternal aunt Jochebed, the mother of Miriam, Aaron and Moses. However, according to the Septuagint, she was his cousin.
 Amnon, King David's eldest son and heir to the throne, raped his half-sister Tamar. Tamar's brother, Absalom, learned of the incident and, two years later, ordered his servants to have Amnon killed. In vain with Amnon, Tamar said, "Now therefore, I pray thee, speak unto the king; for he will not withhold me from thee".
 Absalom, son of King David, in the middle of a rebellion against his father, had sex with his father's concubines on the roof inside a tent.
 Rehoboam, son of Solomon and Naamah, married Maacah daughter of Absalom. 2 Samuel 14:27 does not list Maacah as a daughter of Absalom, but Absalom seems to have had sex with the wives of David, his father, at the advice of Ahithophel.
 Zelophehad's daughters, Mahlah, Tirzah, Hoglah, Milcah and Noah, married their cousins on their father's side to obey the Lord's command. The Lord said: "no inheritance shall be transferred from one tribe to another".
 Caleb said, “I will give my daughter Acsah in marriage to the one who attacks and captures Kiriath-sepher.” Othniel, the son of Caleb’s brother Kenaz, was the one who conquered it, so Acsah became Othniel’s wife.

See also
 Jewish views on incest
 Levirate marriage
 Sex in the Hebrew Bible

Notes

References
 Akerly, Ben Edward, The X-Rated Bible: An Irreverent Survey of Sex in the Scriptures (Feral House, 1998) ; pp. 1–13

Incest
Sexuality in the Bible